Rotylenchulus parvus is a plant pathogenic nematode infecting papaya.

References

External links 
 Nemaplex, University of California - Rotylenchulus parvus

Tylenchida
Plant pathogenic nematodes
Papaya tree diseases
Nematodes described in 1961